Family Voices is a radio play by Harold Pinter written in 1980 and first broadcast on BBC Radio 3 on 22 January 1981.

Summary
Family Voices exposes the story of a mother, son, and dead husband and father through a series of letters that the mother and son have written to one another and that each speaks aloud. The son has moved off to the city and is surrounded by odd characters and circumstances. The mother, who apparently never receives her son's letters, questions angrily why her son never responds to her letters, and brings news of his father's death.  Towards the end of the play, the father speaks as it were from the grave, "Just to keep in touch" (81). 

A series of interlocking monologues spoken by three Voices (One, Two, and Three), Family Voices exposes themes involving difficulties of communication, the vicissitudes of memory and the past, and family dysfunction familiar from Pinter's other dramatic works, employing some of Pinter's well-known stylistic traits. The peculiar circumstances of the characters evoke the Theatre of the Absurd. The mother and son continually have trouble communicating with each other, resulting in more intense attempts at communication that only serve to make the situation more absurd.

Productions
Première
It was first broadcast as a radio play  on BBC Radio 3 on 22 January 1981. Directed by Sir Peter Hall, the cast included:
Michael Kitchen - Voice One
Peggy Ashcroft - Voice Two
Mark Dignam - Voice Three

Subsequently, it was presented in a "platform performance" directed by Hall at London's Cottesloe Theatre with the same cast.

In October 1982, it was presented again as part of Other Places, along with two of Pinter's other works, a one-act play A Kind of Alaska and a shorter play Victoria Station, also directed by Hall.  For this production, the cast included:
Nigel Havers – Voice One
Anna Massey – Voice Two
Paul Rogers – Voice Three

Other theatre personnel were:
John Bury, Design and Lighting
John Caulfield, Stage Manager
Kenneth Mackintosh, Staff Director
Jason Barnes, Production Manager

It was given lunchtime stage performances by the Royal Shakespeare Company at the Barbican Theatre in February and April 1987. The cast included:
Anton Lesser - Voice One
Ruby Head - Voice Two
Mark Dignam - Voice Three

Another theatrical trilogy entitled Other Places, with Pinter's then-newer play One for the Road (1984) instead of Family Voices, was directed by Alan Schneider, in New York City.  (This production is not listed on Pinter's official website.)

The play received its West End premiere as part of the Pinter at the Pinter season at the Harold Pinter Theatre in December 2018, directed by Patrick Marber. The cast included:
 Luke Thallon - Voice One
Jane Horrocks - Voice Two
Rupert Graves - Voice Three

Publication
The play was first published in the United Kingdom in a spiral binding by Next Editions in 1981, with illustrations by artist Guy Vaesen, a family friend of Harold Pinter and Vivien Merchant, Pinter's first wife (Baker and Ross 85; Billingon, Harold Pinter 134–35).

Later, in 1983, it was published in a volume entitled Other Places, along with A Kind of Alaska and Victoria Station, by Grove Press, Pinter's American publisher, in both hardback and paperback editions (Baker and Ross 85–90).

Notes

Works cited

External links
Family Voices – 1982 platform performances at the Cottesloe Theatre (NT).
Family Voices – 1987 stage performances at the Barbican Theatre (Royal Shakespeare Company).
Other Places – Listed in "Plays" section of haroldpinter.org. [Includes photograph of programme cover of Other Places (Cottesloe), details of that London première, and the retyped text of "The Withering of Love", a production review by Alan Jenkins originally published in the Times Literary Supplement (29 Oct 1982) and reproduced with permission.]
Other Places: Four Plays by Harold Pinter (Dramatists Play Service). Google Books.

1980 plays
Plays by Harold Pinter